Ben Hills (1942 – 10 June 2018) was an Australian freelance journalist and author.

Early life and career
Hills was born in Grassington, England and migrated with his family to Australia in 1959. He worked on various regional newspapers before being hired as an investigative reporter by The Age in Melbourne in 1969. He worked for The Age and The Sydney Morning Herald as a London-based foreign correspondent in the mid-1970s then as a Hong-Kong based publisher during the 1980s. Returning to Melbourne, Hills became assistant editor of The Age. He spent four years as a producer for 60 Minutes. Hills became the Fairfax Japan correspondent from 1992 to 1995 and then lived in Sydney. He wrote six books, and after leaving Fairfax worked as a freelancer for SBS TV and other media outlets.

Hills died from cancer in Sydney on 10 June 2018.

Awards

2016 – John Newfong Award for Outstanding Indigenous Reporting
2010 – Alex Buzo Prize for Excellence in Research.
1991 – Walkley Award for investigative reporting 
1989 – Highly Commended, Graham Perkin Australian Journalist of the Year Award

Bibliography
Stop the presses: how greed, incompetence (and the internet) wrecked Fairfax. ABC Books, Sydney, 2014.
 Breaking news: the golden age of Graham Perkin Scribe, Melbourne 2010. About the Australian editor Graham Perkin.
 The island of the ancients: the secrets of Sardinia's Centenarians Murdoch Books, Sydney 2008
 Princess Masako: Prisoner of the Chrysanthemum Throne Tarcher/Penguin, New York 2006
 Japan behind the lines Sydney : Hodder Headline, Melbourne 1996
 Blue murder: two thousand doomed to die, the shocking truth about Wittenoom's deadly dust Sun Books, Melbourne 1989

References

External links
 Official Website

1942 births
2018 deaths
Australian freelance journalists
English emigrants to Australia
People from Craven District
Deaths from cancer in New South Wales